
Gmina Osiek is a rural gmina (administrative district) in Starogard County, Pomeranian Voivodeship, in northern Poland.

Villages
Gmina Osiek contains the villages and settlements of Błędno, Bukowiny, Cisowy, Dębia Góra, Długolas, Dobry Brat, Frąca, Gęby, Głuche, Grabowiec, Jasieniec, Jaszczerek, Jaszczerz, Jeżewnica, Karszanek, Kasparus, Komorze, Lisówko, Łuby, Markocin, Okarpiec, Osiek, Osiek-Pole, Piecki, Pieczyska, Radogoszcz, Recice, Skórzenno, Skrzynia, Suchobrzeźnica, Szlaga-Młyn, Trzebiechowo, Udzierz, Wierzbiny, Wycinki, Wycinki Małe, Wymysłowo, Zdrójki and Żurawki.

Neighbouring gminas
Gmina Osiek is bordered by the town of Skórcz and by the gminas of Lubichowo, Nowe, Osie, Osieczna, Skórcz, Śliwice, Smętowo Graniczne and Warlubie.

References
Polish official population figures 2006

Osiek
Gmina Osiek